The Best of Philip K. Dick is a collection of science fiction stories by American writer Philip K. Dick.  It was first published by Del Rey Books in 1977  as a volume in its Classic Library of Science Fiction. Many of the stories had originally appeared in the magazines Planet Stories, Fantasy and Science Fiction, Space Science Fiction, Imagination, Astounding Stories, Galaxy Science Fiction, Amazing Stories, Science Fiction Stories and Startling Stories, as well as the anthologies Dangerous Visions and Star Science Fiction Stories No.3.

Contents

 Introduction: The Reality of Philip K. Dick, by John Brunner"
 "Beyond Lies the Wub"
 "Roog"
 "Second Variety"
 "Paycheck"
 "Impostor"
 "Colony"
 "Expendable"
 "The Days of Perky Pat"
 "Breakfast at Twilight"
 "Foster, You're Dead!"
 "The Father-Thing"
 "Service Call"
 "Autofac"
 "Human Is"
 "If There Were No Benny Cemoli"
 "Oh, to Be a Blobel!"
 "Faith of Our Fathers"
 "The Electric Ant"
 "A Little Something for Us Tempunauts"
 Afterthoughts by the Author

References

1977 short story collections
Short story collections by Philip K. Dick
Del Rey books